Harlequin is an adventure campaign published by FASA in 1990 for the near-future dystopian role-playing game Shadowrun.

Description
Harlequin is a 151-page book designed by Tome Dowd, Ken St. Andre, John Faughnan, W. G. Armintrout, Jerry Epperson, Paul R. Hume, Lester W. Smith, and James L. Long. The various adventures in the book are specifically designed to be interspersed between other adventures, rather than being run sequentially, so that the players don't immediately realize there's a connection between the various adventures. The ultimate result or consequence of the missions is not revealed in this book, even to the gamemaster. Author Tom Dowd wrote, "Future game products will be based on hidden elements of Harlequin [...] GMs are not the only ones who might read an adventure book so we don’t want to give away any surprises.”

Plot summary
Harlequin is a series of adventures in which the shadowrunners are sent on a string of missions to solve a puzzle.

Reception
In the November 1992 edition of Dragon (Issue #187), Allen Varney didn't like the "hidden ending" that would be revealed in later publications, but thought "Harlequin achieves striking effects through its component sections’ cumulative power. The first moment that the team realizes the connection  between dsiparate scenarios is magical." Varney concluded that the book largely achieves ambitious goals.

Awards
In 1991, Harlequin won the Origins Award for Best Roleplaying Adventure of 1990.

Reviews
White Wolf #26 (April/May, 1991)

References

Origins Award winners
Role-playing game supplements introduced in 1990
Shadowrun adventures